An offshore wind port describes several distinct types of port facilities that are used to support manufacturing, construction and operation of an offshore wind power project. Offshore wind turbine components are larger than onshore wind components. Handling of such large components requires special equipment. Transporting of components between manufacturing and assembling facilities is to be minimized. As a result, a number of offshore wind port facilities have been built in areas with a high concentration of offshore wind developments. For large offshore wind farm projects, some offshore wind ports have become strategic hubs of the industry's supply chain.

The  Port of Esbjerg in Denmark is considered the world's largest offshore wind port.

Types

Small oceanic ports
These are small port facilities to launch survey vessels used in an early stage of an offshore wind farm development.

Manufacturing ports
Large offshore wind turbine components are difficult to transport over land. Locating a manufacturing facility at a port is more desirable. Subcomponents and materials may be brought through roads or railways. After components are built, they are typically shipped to a marshaling port for the final assembly.

Marshaling ports
Marshaling ports (also known as staging ports) are used to collect and store wind turbine components prior to loading them on to wind turbine installation vessels. They are preferably located where there is unrestricted air draft to the wind farm site.

Operating and maintenance ports
Operating and maintenance ports house facilities and vessels that are required for ongoing operating and maintenance of offshore wind farms. This may include part warehouse, offices, and training facilities.

By region

Europe
The six leading offshore wind ports in Europe service wind farms in the North Sea. Their respective countries signed the Ejsberg Declaration in 2022 in which they agreed coordinate supply chain activites to optimize the manufacture and delivery wind turbine components.
 Port of Esbjerg, (DK), the world's largest offshore wind port
 Port of Ostend, (BE)
 Groningen Seaports/Eemshaven, (NL)
 Niedersachsen Ports/Cuxhaven, (DE)
 Nantes/Saint-Nazaire, (FR)
 Humber/Port of Hull (UK)

United States
As of 2021, offshore wind power in the United States was described as a "burgeoning" industry. At that time, a number of ports were proposing to build or convert facilities to handle the large components needed to build potential offshore wind farms. Among those on the East Coast, from north to south are:

Salem Harbor (MA)
Port of New Bedford (MA)
Brayton Point Commerce Center/Mount Hope Bay (MA)
Port of Providence (RI)
State Pier Port of New London (CT)
Arthur Kill Terminal (NY)
Port of Paulsboro (NJ)
New Jersey Wind Port, the "first offshore wind port" in the United States, which broke ground in late 2021
Port of Baltimore (MD) - Sparrows Point
Portsmouth Marine Terminal (VA)

References

 
Infrastructure
Industrial buildings
Wind power